Bernini is a crater on Mercury. It has a diameter of 146 kilometers. Its name was adopted by the International Astronomical Union (IAU) in 1976. Bernini is named for the Italian architect and sculptor Gian Lorenzo Bernini, who lived from 1598 to 1680.

Bernini is one of 110 peak ring basins on Mercury.

References

Gian Lorenzo Bernini
Impact craters on Mercury